The Diocese of Bangor is a diocese of the Church in Wales in North West Wales. The diocese covers the counties of Anglesey, most of Caernarfonshire and Merionethshire and the western part of Montgomeryshire.

History
The diocese in the Welsh kingdom of Gwynedd was founded around 546 by Saint Deiniol. As with the rest of Wales, it initially resisted the papal mission of St Augustine of Canterbury in Britain. In 1534, the church in England and Wales broke allegiance with the Catholic Church and established the Church of England.

The Report of the Commissioners appointed by his Majesty to inquire into the Ecclesiastical Revenues of England and Wales (1835) found the see had an annual net income of £4,464. This made it the second wealthiest diocese in Wales, after St Asaph.

After a brief restoration with the Holy See during the reign of Queen Mary I, the diocese remained part of the Anglican Province of Canterbury until the early 20th century. Following the Welsh Church Act 1914, the Welsh dioceses formed the independent Church in Wales within the Anglican Communion on 31 March 1920.

Bishops of Bangor

The Bishop of Bangor is the ordinary of the Diocese of Bangor. The incumbent is Andy John, who was consecrated the 81st Bishop of Bangor in 2008.

Archdeaconries and deaneries 

Before the recent reorganisation the deaneries were:

 under the Archdeacon of Bangor: Archlechwedd, Arfon, Llifon-Talybolion, Malltraeth, Ogwen, Tyndaethwy and Twrcelyn.
 under the Archdeacon of Merioneth: Ardudwy, Arwystli, Cyfeiliog-Mawddwy, Llyn-Eifionydd and Ystumaner.

List of churches 
The diocese is divided into 27 Ministry Areas and 170 churches. There are three deaneries where previously there were twelve. In 2018 the deaneries of Synod De Meirionnydd and Synod Gogledd Meirionnydd were merged into a single Synod Meirionnydd. There are at least 101 former churches within the area covered by the diocese, at least 23 of which have closed since 2000.

Synod Bangor

Closed churches in the area

Synod Meirionnydd

Closed churches in this area

Synod Ynys Mon

Closed churches in this area

References

External links
 

Dioceses of the Church in Wales